Selenka is a surname. Notable people with the surname include:

Emil Selenka (1842–1902), German zoologist
Margarethe Lenore Selenka (1860–1922), German zoologist, anthropologist, and feminist

See also
Selena (given name)
Selenča, a village in Serbia
Zelenka, a Czech surname